Gabriel Deac (born 26 April 1995) is a Romanian professional footballer who plays as a midfielder for Gloria Bistrița-Năsăud. In his career, Deac also played for teams such as FC Voluntari, Petrolul Ploiești or FC Argeș Pitești.

Honours
FC Voluntari
Liga II: 2014–15
Romanian Cup: 2016–17
Romanian Supercup: 2017

References

External links
 
 

1995 births
Living people
Romanian footballers
Association football midfielders
Liga I players
Liga II players
Liga III players
FC Voluntari players
FC Petrolul Ploiești players
FC Argeș Pitești players
CS Concordia Chiajna players
CS Gloria Bistrița-Năsăud footballers
Sportspeople from Bistrița
21st-century Romanian people